Periyar Arts College, is a general degree college located in Cuddalore, Tamil Nadu. It was established in the year 1964.  This college offers different courses in arts, commerce and science.

Departments

Science
Physics
Chemistry
Mathematics
Statistics
Microbiology
Botany
Zoology
Computer Science

Arts and Commerce
Tamil
English
History
Political Science
Public Administration
Economics
Social Work
Visual Communication
Business Administration
Commerce

Accreditation
The college is  recognized by the University Grants Commission (UGC).

References

External links

Educational institutions established in 1964
1964 establishments in Madras State
Colleges affiliated to Thiruvalluvar University
Cuddalore
Academic institutions formerly affiliated with the University of Madras